About Darkness is the debut album of the Greek metal band Saddolls. This was also the only album to feature a live keyboard player as a band member.

Track listing

Personnel

Band
 George Downloved – Vocals
 Paul Evilrose – Guitar
 Daniel Aven – Guitar
 Miltos Demonized - Bass
 Darroc - Drums
 M-Teo (Teo Buzz) - Keyboards

Guest musician:
 Helen Papapanagiotou – Female vocals
 Vangelis Yalamas - Backing Vocals - Additional Bass
 Lord Exetheris - Growls And Screams
 John Ioannidis - Additional Guitars
 Oberon - Additional Keyboards

Production
John Petrolias – Mastering
Mironized – Design
Vangelis Yalamas – Engineer
Vangelis Yalamas – Mixing

Videos

References

2009 debut albums
Saddolls albums